Frederick Halstead Teese (October 21, 1823 – January 7, 1894) was a U.S. Representative from New Jersey.

Biography
Born in Newark, New Jersey, Teese graduated from Princeton University on October 21, 1843.  He studied law with attorney Asa Whitehead, was admitted to the bar in 1846, and commenced practice in Newark, New Jersey.

Teese served in the New Jersey State Assembly in 1860 and 1861, and was Speaker in 1861. He was the presiding judge of the Essex County Court of Common Pleas from 1864 until his resignation in 1872.

In 1874, Teese was elected as a Democrat to the Forty-fourth Congress (March 4, 1875 – March 3, 1877).  He declined the nomination for reelection in 1876, resumed the practice of law.

He died in New York City January 7, 1894, and was interred in Mount Pleasant Cemetery, Newark, New Jersey.

Family
In 1856, Teese married Ann Caroline Darcy.  They were the parents of two daughters, Mary and Catharine.

References

Sources

Magazines

Books

Newspapers

External links

Speakers of the New Jersey General Assembly
Democratic Party members of the United States House of Representatives from New Jersey
1823 births
1894 deaths
Burials at Mount Pleasant Cemetery (Newark, New Jersey)
19th-century American politicians